The lesser Ryukyu shrew, or Watase's shrew (Crocidura watasei) is a common species of shrews that is endemic to Japan. It is often found living in bushes and grasslands along the river banks and in shrubs of lower elevations.

References

Mammals described in 1924